Two destroyers of the British Royal Navy have been named HMS Legion, after the Roman legion.

 The first, was launched in 1914 and sold in 1921.
 The second, was launched in 1939 and sunk in an air attack off Malta in 1942.

Royal Navy ship names